Darlingscott is a hamlet in the civil parish of Tredington, in Warwickshire, England. Its population is included under Tredington.

External links

Villages in Warwickshire